Rex T. Tucker (born December 20, 1976) is a former  professional American football offensive guard. He was selected 66th overall in the  1999 NFL Draft by the Chicago Bears for whom he played six seasons (1999–2004). He also played a season with the St. Louis Rams (2005–2006) and the Detroit Lions (2006–2007).

Rex Tucker is currently known to live in Midland, Texas. On February 25, 2009, he was a guest on the Jim Rome Show and was the tenth Rex interviewed in as many shows.

Professional career

On August 28, 2007, he was cut by the Lions.

National Football League Campus Testing
40-yard dash - 4.95 seconds
20 yard short shuttle - 4.49 seconds
Vertical jump - 30 inches
Maximum Bench Press - 390 pounds
Maximum Squat - 525 pounds

References

1976 births
Living people
People from Midland, Texas
Robert E. Lee High School (Midland, Texas) alumni
American football offensive guards
Texas A&M Aggies football players
Chicago Bears players
St. Louis Rams players
Detroit Lions players